McQueen was a Canadian drama television series which aired on CBC Television from 1969 to 1970.

Premise
The plot features newspaper columnist McQueen (Ted Follows) whose The Actioneer feature exposed fraud artists and dubious businesses. He was assisted by Denise (Daphne Gibson) and Natasha (Jan Goldin).

The pilot episode, "There's a Car Upside-Down on My Lawn", concerned the disposition of an abandoned vehicle. The episode won two Canadian Film Awards in 1969, for Best Director (Francis Chapman) and Best Actress in a Non-Feature (Josephine Barrington).

Jenny (Margot Kidder) was featured in two episodes as an employee of McQueen's newspaper. In one episode, she helped expose a scam at a talent agency while in the other she sought McQueen's help for a Vietnam draft evader she was dating.

The series was inspired by Frank Drea's Action Line column of the Toronto Telegram, whose newsroom was used to film scenes for the series.

Guest actors during the series included Ruth Springford, Austin Willis and Louis Zorich.

Scheduling
McQueen was broadcast on Tuesdays at 9:00 p.m. (Eastern) from 23 September 1969 until 18 September 1970.

References

External links
 
 

CBC Television original programming
1960s Canadian drama television series
1970s Canadian drama television series
1969 Canadian television series debuts
1970 Canadian television series endings
Television series about journalism